McCance is a surname. Notable people with the surname include:

Chester McCance (1911–1956), Canadian football player
Keith McCance (1929–2008), Australian politician
Robert McCance (1898–1993), British academic
Sean E. McCance, American orthopedic surgeon
William McCance (1894–1970), Scottish artist

See also
Elinore McCance-Katz, American physician, academic and government official
McCance Glacier, a glacier of Antarctica